The 2012 Piazza di Siena – CSIO Rome was the 2012 edition of the CSIO Rome, the Italian official show jumping horse show, at the Piazza di Siena in Rome. It was held as CSIO 5*.

In 2012 the Piazza di Siena horse show celebrates its 80th anniversary. In 1922, the first horse show were held at the Piazza di Siena. Since the year 1926 it is an international horse show. Two years later, in 1928, the horse show was first time the location of the Italian official show jumping horse show (CSIO = Concours de Saut International Officiel).

The 2012 edition of the CSIO Rome was held between May 24, 2012 and May 27, 2012. Main sponsor of the 2012 Piazza di Siena horse show was Fixdesign.

FEI Nations Cup of Italy 
The 2012 FEI Nations Cup of Italy is part of the 2012 Piazza di Siena horse show. It was the second competition of the 2012 FEI Nations Cup and was held at Friday, May 25, 2012 at 3:15 pm. The competing teams were: Belgium, the Netherlands, Switzerland, Ireland, Sweden, Great Britain, Germany and France. Also an Italian team as host nation had the chance to start in the competition.

The competition was a show jumping competition with two rounds and optionally one jump-off. The height of the fences were up to 1.60 meters. All teams were allowed to start in the second round. The competition is endowed with 200,000 €.

Winner of the competition was the German team. It was the first victory of Germany in the Italian Nations Cup since 2000. Before this a German team had won in Rome in 1931, 1932, 1933, 1940, 1958, 1971 and 1993.

(grey penalties points do not count for the team result)

Grand Prix “Città di Roma” 
The Grand Prix “Città di Roma” was the major competition of the 2012 Piazza di Siena horse show. The sponsor of this competition is again Loro Piana. It is held at Sunday, May 29, 2011 at 2:15 pm.

The competition is a show jumping competition with two rounds, the height of the fences was up to 1.60 meters. It is endowed with 200,000 €.

References

External links 
 
 2012 results

Piazza di Siena
CSIO Rome
Piazza di Siena